Khmaladze is a Georgian surname. It may refer to
Estate Khmaladze (born 1944), Georgian statistician
Khmaladze transformation
Giorgi Khmaladze, Georgian architect
Lasha Khmaladze (born 1988), Georgian rugby union player
Levan Khmaladze (born 1985), Georgian football midfielder 
Dmitriy Khmaladze (born 1976), Software architect of Georgian descent

From the root "Khmali", meaning Sabre in Georgian